The following people were all born in, residents of, or otherwise closely associated with Little Rock (categorized by area in which each person is best known):

Actors, musicians and others in the entertainment industry

Actors

 Broncho Billy Anderson (1880–1971), born in Little Rock, actor, writer, director, and producer
 Frank Bonner (1942–2021), actor and television director best known for playing sales manager Herb Tarlek on the classic TV sitcom WKRP in Cincinnati
 Rodger Bumpass (born 1951), voice actor best known for playing Squidward Tentacles on the animated television series SpongeBob SquarePants
 Daniel Davis (born 1945), actor best known for playing Niles the Butler on the television program The Nanny
 Gil Gerard (born 1943), actor best known for playing Captain William "Buck" Rogers in 1979–1981 television series Buck Rogers in the 25th Century
 Ann Gillis (1927–2018), film actress of 1930s and '40s
 John LeCompt (born 1973), musician, part of Little Rock scene with bands like Evanescence
 Josh Lucas (born 1971), actor, Sweet Home Alabama, Poseidon, Glory Road, was born in the city
 Roger Mobley (born 1949), child actor, Fury and Walt Disney's Wonderful World of Color, reportedly living in the Little Rock area since 2015
 Corin Nemec (born 1971), actor best known for playing Parker Lloyd Lewis in 1990s TV series Parker Lewis Can't Lose and Jonas Quinn in Stargate SG-1
 George Newbern (born 1964), actor, Adventures in Babysitting, Father of the Bride, was born in the city
 Judge Reinhold (born 1957), actor, lives in the city

Music
 Richard B. Boone (1930–1999), jazz musician and scat singer
 Tammy Graham (born 1968), singer and pianist, born in the city
 Lee Elhardt Hays (1914–1981), folk singer and songwriter for The Weavers, born in the city
 Al Hibbler (1915–2001), blind singer who worked eight years with Duke Ellington before becoming a soloist; civil rights activist in 1950s and 1960s, was born in the city
 Jon Hynes, classical pianist, native of the city
 SL Jones, southern rapper, born in Flint, Michigan, and raised in Little Rock
 Amy Lee (born 1981), lead singer of Evanescence
 Smokie Norful (born 1975), gospel recording artist, born in the city
 Art Porter Jr. (1961–1996), jazz saxophonist 
 Art Porter Sr. (1934–1993), jazz pianist; father of jazz saxophonist Art Porter Jr.
 Florence Price (1887-1953), composer and pianist
 Cory Brandan Putman (born 1976), lead vocalist for Grammy-nominated band Norma Jean and ex-guitarist for Living Sacrifice, a metal band based in Little Rock
 Pharoah Sanders (born 1940), jazz saxophonist
 William Grant Still (1895-1978), composer
 Jason Truby (born 1973), ex-guitarist for the band P.O.D., also in Little Rock-based band Living Sacrifice
 Jason White (born 1973), Green Day's backup guitarist (particularly for American Idiot tour and 21st Century Breakdown tour), born in Little Rock
 Lenny Williams (born 1945), R&B singer

Other entertainers

 Matt Besser (born 1967), comedian, born in the city
 Linda Bloodworth-Thomason (born 1947), film and television producer and director best known for TV series Designing Women
 John Braden (1949–2004), writer, producer, and director of movies and television programs, was born in the city
 Jim Dickinson (1941–2009), record producer, pianist and singer, was born in the city
 Danielle Evans (born 1985), fashion model who won Cycle 6 of UPN's America's Next Top Model
 David Gordon Green (born 1975), filmmaker, born in the city
 Bill Hicks (1961–1994), comedian, lived and died in the city
 Lil' JJ (born 1990), comedian, actor, rapper, has show on Nickelodeon called Just Jordan]'
 Frank Page (1925–2013), radio broadcaster, KLRA, prior to 1947: later with KWKH in Shreveport, Louisiana, where he introduced Elvis in 1954 to national radio audience of Louisiana Hayride.
 Harry Thomason (born 1940), film and television producer and director best known for TV series Designing Women; was a Little Rock high school speech teacher and football coach.

Artists
 Catherine Tharp Altvater (1907–1984), artist and first woman to hold office in the American Watercolor Society, born in Little Rock
 Charlotte Moorman (1933–1991), American cellist, performance artist, and advocate for avant-garde music, was born in Little Rock

Sports people

Baseball

Glenn Abbott (born 1951), baseball player who pitched in the Major Leagues from 1973–1981 and 1983–1984, was born in the city.
Bill Dickey (1907–1993), Major League Baseball player and manager in the Baseball Hall of Fame; lived much of his life in the city.
Randy Jackson (1926–2019), Major League Baseball player
Kevin McReynolds (born 1959), outfielder/designated hitter who played for San Diego Padres and New York Mets, was born in the city.
Brooks Robinson (born 1937), began his career at Lamar Porter Field, Hall of Fame third baseman for Baltimore Orioles from 1955 to 1977; born in Little Rock in 1937
Drew Smyly (born 1989), Major League Baseball pitcher

Basketball

 Hubert Ausbie (born 1938), longtime player with the Harlem Globetrotters
 Derek Fisher (born 1974), professional basketball player for the Los Angeles Lakers and Oklahoma City Thunder, former head coach for the New York Knicks
 Joe Johnson (born 1981), NBA basketball player
 Sidney Moncrief (born 1957), basketball player for Arkansas Razorback and NBA's Milwaukee Bucks; born in Little Rock in 1957

Football

 Jamaal Anderson (born 1986), defensive end for the Indianapolis Colts of the NFL; former high school football star for Little Rock Parkview
 Reggie Arnold (born 1987) running back for the Arkansas State Red Wolves football team
 Walt Coleman, National Football League referee and owner and operator of Coleman Dairy; known for playoff game between Oakland Raiders and New England Patriots which incorporated the "Tuck Rule"
 August Curley (born 1960), NFL player
 Steve Foley (born 1975), professional linebacker for the San Diego Chargers, is a former resident.
 Chris Harris (born 1982), NFL player
 Hunter Henry (born 1994), NFL tight end
 Keith Jackson (born 1965), NFL player for the Philadelphia Eagles, Miami Dolphins, and Green Bay Packers
 Jerry Jones (born 1942), owner of the Dallas Cowboys
 Ken Kavanaugh (1916–2007), professional football player, 1940–1950, for the Chicago Bears.
 Darren McFadden (born 1987), running back for the Dallas Cowboys of the National Football League, was born in the city.
 Houston Nutt (born 1957), coach of University of Arkansas Razorbacks football team from 1997 to 2007, also coached Ole Miss; born in Little Rock
 Lawrence Phillips (1975–2016), American and Canadian football running back, was born in the city; died in prison.
 Vince Warren (born 1963), NFL wide receiver, member of New York Giants' winning Super Bowl team.

Other sports
 Bobo Brazil (1924–1998), African-American professional wrestler
 Kortney Clemons (born 1980), Paralympic athlete and Iraq War veteran.
 Glen Day (born 1965), PGA Tour golfer, winner of 1999 Heritage at Hilton Head, South Carolina.
 Rolando Delgado (born 1981), mixed martial artist.
 Jeff Gorton (born 1968), General manager of the New York Rangers ice hockey team.
 John Kocinski (born 1967), motorcycle road racer who won 1990 250cc World Championship and 1997 World Superbike title, was born in the city
 Jermain Taylor (born 1978), professional boxer and Middleweight Champion of the World in 2005, was born in the city.
 Michael Tinsley (born 1984), professional track runner specializing in the 400m hurdles; silver medalist at the 2012 Summer Olympics and the 2013 World Championships.

Writers, journalists

Margot Adler (1946–2014), journalist born in Little Rock.
Daisy Bates (1914–1999), civil rights leader, journalist, publisher, and author who lived in the city.
Joe Bob Briggs, pseudonym and persona of John Irving Bloom (born 1953), a syndicated film critic, writer and actor, was raised in the city.
Dee Brown (1908–2002), novelist and historian whose most famous work is Bury My Heart at Wounded Knee, grew up partly in the city.
Helen Gurley Brown (1922–2012), author, publisher, and businesswoman who was editor-in-chief of Cosmopolitan magazine for 32 years, lived in the city.
John Gould Fletcher (1886–1950), Pulitzer Prize-winning Imagist poet and author, was born in the city.
Fred Graham (1931–2019), chief anchor and managing editor of Court TV, was born in the city.
E. Lynn Harris (1955–2009), gay, black author with five novels that hit The New York Times Best Seller list, was raised in Little Rock.
Mercer Mayer (born 1943), author and illustrator of children's book Little Critter series and There's a Nightmare in My Closet.
Robert Palmer (1945–1997), a journalist, author of books about music and a musician, was born in the city.
Charles Portis (1933-2020), novelist, was born in El Dorado but lived most of his life in the city.
Alison Rogers (born 1966), journalist and real estate broker, author of Diary of a Real Estate Rookie, was born and bred in Little Rock.
Charles Willeford (1919–1988), author of detective novels and other books, was born in the city.

Politics, government, military

Rick Beck (born 1956), Republican member of Arkansas House of Representatives for Conway and Perry counties, born in Little Rock.
 Roswell Beebe (1795–1856), mayor, alderman, benefactor, president of Cairo and Fulton Railroad.
Charles J. Blake (born 1983), Democratic African-American member of Arkansas House of Representative from a portion of Little Rock; chairman of Daisy Bates Holiday Committee
 Shelby Brewer (1937–2015), top nuclear official in Reagan Administration from 1981 to 1984.
Drew Bowers (1886–1985), Little Rock lawyer, Republican gubernatorial nominee in 1926 and 1928.
Kelly Bryant (1908–1975), Arkansas Secretary of State from 1963 until his death in office.
Preston Bynum (1939–2018), lobbyist and former Republican former member of Arkansas House.
Marvin Childers (born 1961), former Arkansas state representative from Mississippi County, lawyer and poultry industry lobbyist in Little Rock.
 Wesley Clark (born 1944), 2004 presidential candidate; North Atlantic Treaty Organization (NATO) Commander; born in Chicago but a graduate of Hall High School in Little Rock
Bill Clinton (born 1946), 42nd President of the United States and previously Governor of Arkansas, lived in the city.
Hillary Clinton (born 1947), U.S. Secretary of State, U.S. Senator from New York, 2016 presidential candidate, wife of Bill Clinton, former first lady of state and U.S.; lived in the city.
 Chelsea Clinton (born 1980 in Little Rock), daughter of Bill Clinton and Hillary Clinton.
Thomas James Churchill (1824–1905), Confederate general, governor; moved to the city in 1848.
Osro Cobb (1904–1996), lawyer, Republican politician from Montgomery County and later Little Rock.
Sterling R. Cockrill (born 1925), Speaker of the Arkansas House of Representatives, 1967-1968; Republican nominee for lieutenant governor, 1970.
William A. Culpepper (1916–2015), Louisiana state court judge, retired to and died in Little Rock.
Andy Davis (born 1975), Republican member of Arkansas House of Representatives; civil engineer and businessman in his native Little Rock.
 Lynn A. Davis (1933–2011), attorney, lecturer, and head of the state police in 1967, who cleared Hot Springs of illegal gambling, was the U.S. marshal in Little Rock, 1969–1974.
Les Eaves (born 1967), member of the Arkansas House of Representative for White County, former Little Rock resident.
Orval Faubus (1906–1994), a six-term Arkansas governor known for his 1957 stand against integration of Little Rock schools in defiance of United States Supreme Court rulings.
Clay Ford (1938–2013), member of Arkansas House of Representatives from 1975 to 1976; member of Florida House of Representatives from 2007 until his death.
Vivian Flowers (born c. 1969), member of Arkansas House of Representatives; diversity officer at UAMS Medical Center in Little Rock.
Carlos Hathcock  (1942–1999), a legendary Marine sniper during the Vietnam War.
Kenneth Henderson (born c. 1963), Republican member of Arkansas House of Representatives; real estate developer in Russellville, former resident of Little Rock and graduate of UALR.
Thomas C. Hindman (1828–1868), U.S. Representative representing Arkansas and a major general for Confederacy during the American Civil War; assassinated in 1868.
Missy Irvin (born 1971), Republican member of Arkansas State Senate from Stone County since 2011; born in Little Rock.
 Jim Keet (born 1949), state legislator from Little Rock, Republican gubernatorial nominee against incumbent Mike Beebe in 2010 general election
 Allen Kerr (born 1954), Republican member of the Arkansas House of Representatives from Pulaski County; insurance agent in his native Little Rock; state insurance commissioner.
 Douglas MacArthur GCB (1880–1964), United States Army general and Medal of Honor recipient, Supreme Commander of the Allied forces in the South West Pacific Area
 Charles B. MacDonald (1922–1990), United States Army officer of World War II, and military historian.
 Sheffield Nelson (born 1941), businessman and Republican politician.
 Frank Pace Jr. (1912–1988), first president of the Corporation for Public Broadcasting
 Scott E. Parazynski (born 1961), astronaut
 Albert Pike (1809–1891), attorney, soldier, writer, Freemason; only Confederate military figure honored with a statue in Washington D.C., once lived in Little Rock.
 John Selden Roane (1817–1867), Governor of Arkansas and Confederate general; died in Pine Bluff and is buried at Oaklawn Cemetery in Little Rock.
 Tommy F. Robinson (born 1942), former member of the U.S. House of Representatives
David J. Sanders (born 1975), Republican state senator from District 15, Baptist education official in Little Rock.
Jim Sorvillo (born 1948), Republican member of the Arkansas House of Representatives for District 32 in Pulaski County.
Wallace Townsend (1882–1979), Republican national committeeman from Arkansas from 1928 to 1961, Little Rock attorney.
Leona Troxell (1913–2003), longtime Republican national committeewoman from Arkansas and associate of Winthrop Rockefeller, lived in Rose Bud in White County.
Carmen Twillie (born 1959), lawyer and politician, dean of Douglass College.
David Venable (born 1978), intelligence officer, author, and cyber security expert.
John H. Yancey (1918–1986), highly decorated United States Marine.

Others

 Ben M. Bogard (1868–1951), clergyman, founder of American Baptist Association, pastor of Antioch Missionary Baptist Church, a founder of Missionary Baptist Seminary, both in Little Rock
James E. Cofer (born 1949), former professor at the University of Arkansas at Little Rock; president of Missouri State University in Springfield 2010-2011
 Connie Hamzy (born 1955), groupie
 E. Fay Jones (1921–2004), architect, designer and an apprentice of Frank Lloyd Wright
 David Levering Lewis (born 1936), historian, Julius Silver University professor and Professor of History at New York University and recipient of two Pulitzer Prizes
 Samuel P. Massie (1919–2005), a chemist named one of the top 75 distinguished chemists in history by Chemical and Engineering News'', and the first African-American professor of the U.S. Naval Academy.
Wade Rathke (born 1948), founder and chief organizer of Association of Community Organizations for Reform Now (ACORN); he started the non-profit organization in Little Rock.
 Alison Rogers (born 1966), New York City real estate agent and author
 Christian Rudder (born 1975), co-founder, with three others, of dating site OkCupid
 Charlotte Andrews Stephens (1854-1951), first African American to teach in Little Rock, taught for seventy years
 Richard Thalheimer, founder and CEO of Sharper Image; raised in Little Rock

References

Little Rock, Arkansas
Little Rock
People